The Battle of Kulminge was the culmination of the Åland riots during the Finnish War, fought between Sweden and Russia. The riot started in the Sockenstuga at 19 March 1808 and spread all over Åland, to finally culminate at Kumlinge at 9 or 10 May. 450 armed peasants, led by Henrik Gummerus, defeated and captured the equally strong Russian force under Colonel Vuitsch at their headquarters, just outside the Kulminge rectory. The peasants sustained three killed and three captured, while the Russians had one killed and eight wounded. After Vuitsch's capitulation, only about 50 Russian soldiers remained on Brändö who likewise, after a brief engagement, were made prisoners; all of Åland had thus been saved from Russian occupation.

References

Sources

Kumlinge 1808
Sävar
Kumlinge 1808
Kumlinge 1808
Kumlinge 1808
May 1808 events